The 1971 Columbia Lions football team was an American football team that represented Columbia University during the 1971 NCAA University Division football season. Columbia finished third in the Ivy League. 

In their fourth season under head coach Frank Navarro, the Lions compiled a 6–3 record and outscored opponents 166 to 136. John Sefcik and Charles Johnson were the team captains.  

The Lions' 5–2 conference record placed third in the Ivy League standings. Columbia outscored Ivy opponents 149 to 117. 

Columbia played its home games at Baker Field in Upper Manhattan, in New York City.

Schedule

References

Columbia
Columbia Lions football seasons
Columbia Lions football